Galisteo may refer to:
Galisteo, Cáceres, a town in Extremadura, Spain
Galisteo, New Mexico, a census-designated place and village in New Mexico
Galisteo Basin, a basin in New Mexico where the Galisteo River (Galisteo Creek) flows

Persons
José Galisteo, (born 1977), Spanish singer

See also
Guijo de Galisteo, a municipality located in the province of Cáceres, Extremadura, Spain